In the 2010 season, the División de Honor de Béisbol – the top-tier league of baseball in Spain – was won by the team from Sant Boi de Llobregat, Catalonia.

Final standings

2010 champions: Sant Boi

The top four teams played in a final four for the Copa de su Majestad el Rey Beisbol 2010 with the Tenerife Marlins Puerto Cruz winning the Spanish cup.
The champion and the cupwinner qualified for the European Cup.

External links
Real Federación Española de Béisbol y Sófbol

División de Honor de Béisbol